Bill O'Brien is a television series actor, and the Senior Advisor for Program Innovation for the National Endowment of the Arts.

Bill O'Brien was appointed to serve as Deputy Chairman of Grants and Awards for the National Endowment for the Arts shortly after the election of President Barack Obama in 2008 where he supervised the design and implementation of grants and awards programs, designed and led national leadership initiatives, developed partnerships to advance discipline fields, and managed the panel review process across multiple arts disciplines.

In 2009 he was appointed Senior Advisor for Program Innovation for the Endowment. This appointment serves as the senior executive at the NEA responsible for exploring, examining and identifying innovative and emerging practices, programs and endeavors in the arts that are transformative and potentially worthy of federal government support or acknowledgement. In this capacity, he has served as the agency's lead on the Walter Reed/NEA Healing Arts Partnership (including Operation Homecoming) investigating the role of the arts in helping to heal military service members recovering from traumatic brain injuries and psychological health issues, the State Department's "Declaration of Learning" initiative and various activities of interest to the agency at the intersection of arts, science, technology and the humanities.

Prior to these appointments, O'Brien was named the NEA's Director of Theater and Musical Theater in July 2006, where he designed and directed national leadership initiatives, promoted partnerships to advance the theater field, and managed the review process for theater and musical theater applications. In 2007, he designed and initiated the NEA National New Play Development program—administered by Arena Stage, which featured the NEA Outstanding New American Play and Distinguished New Play Development selections.

Before joining the NEA, he served for seven years as producing director and managing director for Deaf West Theater (DWT) where he received a Tony and a Drama Desk nomination for producing the Broadway sign language production of Big River and received three Ovation Award nominations for his work on the production of Big River at Deaf West (as producer, sound designer and lead actor). That production went on to win three Best Musical awards (Ovation, LADCC and Back Stage Garland Awards) and the cast of Big River was awarded the 2004 Tony Honor for Excellence in Theatre.  Other productions he produced for Deaf West include A Streetcar Named Desire (Ovation Award for Best Play) and Oliver! (Ovation Award for Best Musical).  He has appeared in Deaf West productions of True West and Big River (Backstage West Garland Award for Lead Actor, Helen Hayes Award Nomination for Outstanding Lead Actor).

His advocacy efforts on behalf of the Individuals with Disabilities in Education Act of the United States Department of Education helped garner Deaf West Theatre the Secretary of Health and Human Services Highest Recognition Award for “bridging the gap between the deaf and hearing worlds through theatre.”

In addition, O'Brien has served as executive vice president on the executive board of the National Alliance for Music Theatre and as a task force member, conference speaker, and grant panelist with Theatre Communications Group, both national service organization for the theater and musical theater fields.

O'Brien also performed onstage in 48 states in numerous national touring and regional productions, was an American College Theatre Festival Irene Ryan Acting Competition National Finalist and has recurred in all seven seasons as Kenny, Marlee Matlin's interpreter, on The West Wing.

O'Brien graduated with a degree in Musical Theater from the University of Northern Iowa in 1985.

Selected filmography
Gideon's Crossing (2001)
Two episodes, as Conor McGrath

Providence (2002)
Great Expectations''' episode, as Brian McCulleyThe West Wing (2000–2005)
22 episodes, as Kenny Thurman (sign language interpreter for Joey Lucas, the role performed by Marlee Matlin).Law & Order: Criminal Intent (2007)Silencer'' episode, as Detective Peter Lyons

Additional Actor/Singer/Composer/Songwriter Credits
• Composed the score for the independent film "Church".
• 7 year ensemble member of NBC's "The West Wing" (as Kenny, Marlee Matlin's sign language interpreter)
• Recurring and featured roles on network television, including "Law and Order", "Providence" and "Gideon's Crossing". 
• Over 700 performances in 48 states playing Will Rogers in "The Will Rogers Follies".
• Performed roles on national tours and in regional theatre productions including Buddy in "The Buddy Holly Story", Romeo in "Romeo and Juliet", George Bailey in "It's a Wonderful Life", Mark Twain/voice of Huck in "Big River: The Adventures of Huckleberry Finn".
• Composed music for national tours of "The Grapes of Wrath" and "Hand-made Stories" (National Technical Institute for the Deaf
• Composed the score for the independent film "Church".

References

External links

Year of birth missing (living people)
Living people
American male television actors
University of Northern Iowa alumni